One player to a hand is an important poker rule designed to promote fair play that is universally applied in casino play.  It states that all game decisions about the play of each hand must be made by one player without any assistance.  This means, for example, that a player may not ask for advice from any other player or non-player during the play of the hand, nor should anyone offer such advice.  The phrase is often used as a warning to players making what might be perceived as minor violations, such as commenting upon other players' possible hands.

Note that any player correcting an error on a declared holding once the hands are exposed is not a violation of this rule, since no further decisions can be made. Some rulebooks declare it an ethical obligation of a player to point out any error in the awarding of a pot or the reading of hands shown down.  See Cards speak.

See also
Public cardroom rules (poker)

Notes

Poker gameplay and terminology